David Manson may refer to:
 David Manson (militiaman) (1753–1836), Irish-born American patriot who fought in the American Revolutionary War
 David Manson (schoolmaster) (1716-1799), Irish schoolmaster
 David Manson (producer) (born 1952), American film and television producer, screenwriter and director
 David Ames Manson (1841–1929), merchant and political figure in Quebec
 David Manson (footballer) (born 1951), Australian rules footballer
 Dave Manson (born 1967), Canadian ice hockey player

See also
David Monson (disambiguation)
David Munson (disambiguation)